Warhammer 40,000: Space Marine is a third-person shooter hack-n-slash video game developed by Relic Entertainment and published by THQ. It was released for Microsoft Windows, PlayStation 3 and Xbox 360 on September 6, 2011, in North America and September 9, 2011, in Europe. The game takes place in Games Workshop's Warhammer 40,000 universe and features the Ultramarines chapter. Its gameplay focuses on a hybrid shooting and melee combat model.

Gameplay

In Space Marine, the player engages enemies with both melee and ranged from a third-person point of view. The player character, Titus, has regenerative abilities. When his health gets low, performing some actions can allow Titus to regain a portion of his health. Titus is accompanied by the characters Sidonus and Leandros for most of the missions, though some missions are performed alone. The game features a fury meter that, when filled up, grants rapid health regeneration and stronger melee attacks. This ability can later be upgraded with purity seals to improve the duration, the rate at which it recharges and the effectiveness of ranged attacks (slow motion when zoomed, faster fire rate and increased damage).

The starting weapons include a combat knife and a bolt pistol, though the player can acquire other weapons. The game also includes a new weapon not featured in the table-top game known as the Vengeance Launcher, which can shoot sticky fusion grenades.

The game's main antagonists are the Orks and the Forces of Chaos. The Orks are an alien race of brutish warriors. The Forces of Chaos are an even greater threat, and can summon monsters that live in a parallel dimension known as The Warp. Portals conjured by the Traitor Legions allow daemons to enter the battlefield.

Synopsis

Setting and characters

The events of the story take place on Forge World Graia, a planet devoted to producing military weapons for the Imperium of Man which has been invaded by alien Orks.

The game follows a Command Squad of three Ultramarines, a group of genetically-engineered, cybernetically enhanced super soldiers referred to in-universe as "Space Marines" or "Adeptus Astartes". The main characters are 2nd Company Commander and playable character Captain Titus (voiced by Mark Strong), his immediate subordinate Veteran Sergeant Sidonus, and a relatively inexperienced and by-the-book Tactical Marine named Leandros. Other notable characters include Imperial Guard commander Second Lieutenant Miranda 'Mira' Nero and Ordo Xenos Inquisitor Drogan.

Plot
After the invasion of Forge World Graia by Orks, Imperial military commanders consider various methods to regain control of Graia, especially since the loss of Graia's industrial output has greatly affected local Imperial war-making capabilities. In the end, it is decided to deploy a group of Space Marines of the Ultramarines chapter to reinforce local Imperial forces.

Initially upon arrival, the squad provides assistance to the outnumbered and overrun Imperial Guard regiments fighting on the planet's surface, which after the loss in battle of all higher-ranking officers are now being led by the sole surviving junior officer, Second Lieutenant Miranda 'Mira' Nero; she informs Titus of the present situation and briefly accompanies the squad to their next engagement. Titus agrees to silence the captured planetary defense cannon, which has been preventing supply ships from reaching the beleaguered defenders. This done, Mira thanks the Space Marines and continues to help Titus however she can over the course of the game, amidst re-organizing the remaining Imperial Guard forces and attempting to hold the majority of the invading hordes at bay until the delayed reinforcement fleet arrives. The Space Marines then move on to continue with their own mission and, amidst securing the Titan Invictus (one of a class of giant, bipedal war machines that are produced primarily on Graia and the principal reason for the Ultramarines' deployment there), answer a distress call from the injured Imperial Inquisitor Drogan, from whom they learn of a weapon that can wipe out the Orks, but which needs a power source that is located in a reactor below the Manufactorum. Titus retrieves it and activates the Psychic Scourge, but the Orks are not killed. Instead, a Warp gate to the psychic realm of Chaos is opened, unleashing several daemons that massacre the surrounding Orks. Moments later, the Chaos Lord Nemeroth emerges from the portal. Using his Warp powers, he subdues the Space Marine squad as Inquisitor Drogan arrives via lift and approaches Nemeroth, revealing his allegiance to the Chaos Lord. It is then revealed that Drogan was killed at some point prior to meeting Titus and his corpse was possessed and used by Nemeroth as a sleeper agent. Titus gathers enough strength to grab the Power Source, which had been ejected from the Scourge, and Nemeroth is ambushed by Grimskull, the Ork Warboss in charge of their invasion of Graia, allowing the Space Marines to escape.

The Scourge opens a growing Warp portal around the Orbital Spire, allowing Chaos forces to pour in; seeing this, Titus forms a plan to destroy the portal and the Spire by using one of the Titans they had secured earlier (their original mission). On the way, Titus faces Grimskull again and finally ends his life with a plasma shot to the head after a grueling battle. The Titan Invictus is supercharged by the Power Source and destroys the Spire. Realizing that the Power Source is too dangerous to be entrusted by anyone, even the Inquisition, Titus decides to bring it back to the Chapter Master of The Ultramarine and the Chief Librarian so they can seal it in the Chapter’s armory. However, Sidonus is killed by Nemeroth, the Power Source is stolen and taken to the floating remains of the Spire.

The reinforcement fleet now having finally arrived, including a company of Blood Ravens Space Marines, the rest of Titus's company and large numbers of Imperial Guard, Titus leads them in an attack through the remaining Chaos forces to stop Nemeroth from performing a ritual to ascend to the status of a Daemon Prince using the power of the device. Nemeroth has partially ascended to Daemonhood when Titus finally faces him again; both are knocked off the spire in the struggle, and the Captain defeats him in single combat while falling towards the ground. He then breaks the experimental device in half with his hands. Titus survives the exposure to the raw Warp energy again, and is rescued by a Thunderhawk dropship before he can impact the ground.

The end scene of the game involves a new Imperial Inquisitor by the name of Thrax, accompanied by Leandros and escorted by several Black Templar Space Marines, who places Titus under arrest. Leandros believes that his Captain has been corrupted by Chaos based on Titus’ resistance to warp energies. Titus denies accusations of heresy and is backed up in this by Lieutenant Mira who also protests the accusation, but Titus warns her to back down, knowing the extent of the Inquisition's wrath. Titus is willing to find the cause of his own mysterious resistance to Chaos, and voluntarily goes with Inquisitor Thrax on the condition that the Inquisition leaves the planet, its inhabitants (including Mira) and his fellow Ultramarines alone. Before taking off from the planet, Titus chastises Leandros for his singleminded following of the Codex Astartes, and his inability to see past it and think for himself - something Titus believes is the true test of a Space Marine.

A computerised report in Imperial records shows that the threat on Graia has been contained. The planet is under quarantine by order of Inquisitor Thrax, and Titus is under investigation by the Inquisition on charges of heresy.

Development and release
Developer Relic Entertainment recruited staff with experience of working on console titles to assist in the creation of the game. This included people who had worked on the Gears of War, God of War and Far Cry series.

THQ released a playable demo for Xbox 360 and PC on August 23, 2011 and for PlayStation 3 on August 24, 2011.

Two sequels were planned but were cancelled due to the closure of THQ.

On September 23, 2021, SEGA announced and released an Anniversary Edition of the game on PC with it being a free update to owners of the original game. The Anniversary Edition includes all of the officially released DLC as well as other digital items such as the soundtrack, strategy guide, art book, cards, ringtone, wallpapers, and the game's launch trailer.

On December 10, 2021 at the Game awards, its sequel titled Space Marine 2 was finally announced for PC, PS5 and Xbox Series S|X.

Downloadable content
Several character skins and models for Space Marine and Chaos Marine chapters have been released, along with content that was originally reserved for those who preordered the game. A new wave based game mode called "Exterminatus" was also made available for free download.

A downloadable content (DLC) package titled "Chaos Unleashed" was released on December 20, 2011. It adds a new mode to Exterminatus where players can take on the role of Chaos Space Marines as they fight both the Ork horde and Imperial Guard forces. The pack also includes three new multiplayer maps: Habs Ablaze, Station Tertius, and Aquila Canyon, which can be played in all multiplayer game modes, and ten new achievements and trophies.

An additional DLC package, "The Dreadnought", was released on January 24, 2012. This premium add-on added a new multiplayer mode called "Dreadnought Assault", in which two teams battle to capture a central location on the map and the winners spawn a player-controlled Dreadnought. The Dreadnought is armed with an Assault Cannon / Autocannon, a Meltagun and a Power Fist / Power Claw and the team must capture points across the map to score points. The Dreadnought DLC also includes three new multiplayer maps: Desolation, Dome Mechanicus, and Chem Refinery.

Music
The soundtrack for Warhammer 40,000: Space Marine was composed by Cris Velasco and Sascha Dikiciyan.

Reception

Warhammer 40,000: Space Marine has received "mixed or average" reviews for Microsoft Windows and PlayStation 3, and "generally favorable" reviews for Xbox 360, according to review aggregator Metacritic. IGN praised the re-creation of the Warhammer 40,000 universe and the variety in the enemy encounters. GamePro complimented the visuals of the game and the blending of hack-and-slash and shooter gameplay, but criticized the campaign, claiming that it was linear and that some of the environments were uninspired.

Sequel

On December 9, 2021 Saber Interactive and Focus Entertainment announced Warhammer 40,000: Space Marine 2 with a cinematic trailer. It is confirmed that Captain Titus is making his return and has become a Primaris Space Marine. The trailer features Tyranids as enemies. It was also announced that the role of Titus had been recast, and he will now be voiced by Clive Standen.

References

External links
 
 Warhammer 40,000: Space Marine at MobyGames

2011 video games
PlayStation 3 games
Third-person shooters
Hack and slash games
THQ games
Video games developed in Canada
S
Windows games
Xbox 360 games
Multiplayer and single-player video games
Relic Entertainment games
Video games about demons
Video games scored by Cris Velasco
Video games scored by Sascha Dikiciyan
Video games set on fictional planets